Rebecca Stevens "Becky" Halstead (born 1959) is a former United States Army officer and the first female graduate of West Point to become a general officer. She was the 34th Chief of Ordnance and Commandant of the United States Army Ordnance Center and Schools at Aberdeen Proving Ground, Maryland.

Early life
Halstead was born in Willseyville, New York in 1959, and is a 1977 graduate of Candor High School. She graduated from the United States Military Academy with a Bachelor of Science in 1981 and was a member of the second academy class that included women.

Early career

When she was assigned to the Ordnance Corps, her early positions included: platoon leader, operations officer and executive officer with the 69th Ordnance Company, 559th Artillery Group in Vicenza, Italy; commander, Headquarters and Headquarters Company, 80th Ordnance Battalion, Fort Lewis, Washington; commander, 63rd Ordnance company, 80th Ordnance Battalion, Fort Lewis, Washington; and Materiel Officer, 80th Ordnance Battalion, Fort Lewis, Washington.

Her later assignments included: assignment officer, Ordnance Branch, Total Army Personnel Command, Alexandria, Virginia; aide-de-camp to the commander, Combined Arms Support Command and Fort Lee, Fort Lee, Virginia; support operations officer and battalion executive officer, 526th Forward Support Battalion, 101st Airborne Division, Fort Campbell, Kentucky; logistics staff officer, and assistant executive officer to the U.S. Army's Deputy Chief of Staff for Logistics; commander, 325th Forward Support Battalion, 25th Infantry Division, Schofield Barracks, Hawaii; commander, 10th Mountain Division Support Command (DISCOM), Fort Drum, New York, including duty as logistics staff officer (C-4) for Coalition Task Force Afghanistan during Operation Enduring Freedom; and executive officer to the combatant commander, United States Southern Command, Miami, Florida.

Later career

In September 2003 Halstead was assigned as Deputy Commander of the 21st Theater Support Command in Germany. In September 2004 she was assigned as commander, 3rd Corps Support Command (COSCOM), including deployment to Iraq for the Iraq War. In January 2005, she was promoted to brigadier general, the first female graduate of West Point to attain general officer rank.

In 2006 Halstead was assigned as the Army's Chief of Ordnance and commander, U.S. Army Ordnance Center and Schools at Aberdeen Proving Ground, Maryland.  During her tenure, she took part in the planning for the Army's effort to streamline its Ordnance, Transportation and Supply career fields by creating a single Combined Logistics branch.  As part of the Base Realignment and Closure (BRAC) initiative, this streamlining included the closing of the ordinance center in Abderdeen Proving Ground and its relocation to Fort Lee, Virginia.  She retired from the military in June 2008.

Education
Halstead is a graduate of the Army's Ordnance Officer Basic Course and Ordnance Officer Advanced Course.  She obtained a Master of Military Art and Science degree from the U.S. Army Command and General Staff College at Fort Leavenworth, Kansas, in 1993, and in 2000 she received a Master of Science degree in national resource strategy from the National War College, Fort McNair, Washington, D.C.

Awards and qualification badges
Halstead's military decorations include: the Distinguished Service Medal; the Defense Superior Service Medal; two awards of the Legion of Merit; the Bronze Star Medal; five awards of the Meritorious Service Medal; two awards of the Army Commendation Medal; and the Army Achievement Medal. She also earned the Air Assault Badge and the Army Staff Identification Badge.

Post-military career
After her retirement Halstead was elected President of the U.S. Army Ordnance Corps Association, and joined the Praevius Group, a Virginia-based consulting firm, as Executive Director for Leader Development. She later founded her own consulting firm, Steadfast Leadership. In addition, she is a spokesperson for the Foundation for Chiropractic Progress.

Other honors
In 2007 Halstead received the National Women’s History Project award for "Generations of Women Moving History Forward." In 2011 she became the first woman to have a room named after her at West Point's Thayer Hotel. She is also a 2011 inductee of the Ordnance Corps Hall of Fame.  In 2013 she was inducted into the New Jersey Women's Hall of Fame. In 2021, Halstead was inducted into the National Women's Hall of Fame.

See also
List of female United States military generals and flag officers

References

1959 births
Living people
21st-century American women
People from Candor, New York
United States Military Academy alumni
Female generals of the United States Army
United States Army Command and General Staff College alumni
National War College alumni
United States Army personnel of the War in Afghanistan (2001–2021)
United States Army personnel of the Iraq War
Recipients of the Distinguished Service Medal (US Army)
Recipients of the Legion of Merit
Women in the Iraq War
Recipients of the Defense Superior Service Medal